was a town located in Tagata District, Shizuoka Prefecture, Japan in central Izu Peninsula.

As of March 1, 2005, the town had an estimated population of 15,169 and a density of 348 persons per km². The total area was 43.56 km². The town has a station on the Izuhakone Railway.

On April 1, 2005, Ōhito, along with the towns of Izunagaoka and Nirayama (all from Tagata District), was merged to create the city of Izunokuni and thus it no longer exists as an independent municipality.

See also
Ohito Declaration

External links
 Izunokuni official website 

Dissolved municipalities of Shizuoka Prefecture
Populated places disestablished in 2005
2005 disestablishments in Japan
Izunokuni